Church Home and Hospital (formerly the Church Home and Infirmary) was a hospital in Baltimore, located on Broadway, between East Fayette and East Baltimore Streets, on Washington Hill, several blocks south of the Johns Hopkins Hospital, that also operated a long-term care facility. It was affiliated with the Episcopal Diocese of Maryland of the Episcopal Church (United States).
It closed down permanently in 2000 and was later re-opened as a unit known as the "Church Home and Hospital Building" of J.H.H.

History
The location first opened in 1833 as the  Washington Medical College. The building was purchased by the Church Home Society of the Protestant Episcopal Church on 2 October 1857 and called the Church Home and Infirmary.  Washington Medical College was the medical school connected with Washington College of Pennsylvania (now part of the Washington & Jefferson College).

Edgar Allan Poe (1809–1849) was taken to this location when he was found semiconscious and ill in a street gutter near East Lombard Street; this is where he subsequently died in October 1849.

During the 1940s, Church Home and Hospital was one of three Baltimore hospitals providing a sparse number of beds for "colored" patients.

In 1978, a plan to expand the hospital was opposed.

Current usage of grounds
A new 166 unit townhouse development known as Broadway Overlook was built in 2005 by the Housing Authority of Baltimore City on the old grounds of the hospital surrounding it on the south, west and north sides associated with J.H.H.

References

Defunct hospitals in Maryland
Hospitals in Baltimore
Hospitals established in 1833
2000 disestablishments in Maryland
1833 establishments in Maryland